Jundiapeba is a train station on CPTM Line 11-Coral, located in the district of Jundiapeba in Mogi das Cruzes.

History
Jundiapeba train station was built by EFCB and opened on 20 July 1914 named Santo Ângelo. It was renamed to Jundiapeba in mid-1950s. The station was transferred from CBTU to CPTM in 1994.

References

Companhia Paulista de Trens Metropolitanos stations
Railway stations opened in 1914
Railway stations in Mogi das Cruzes